Kary is both a surname and a given name. Notable people with the name include:

Surname:
Douglas Kary, Republican member of the Montana Legislature
Hans Kary (born 1949), former Austrian professional tennis player

Given name:
Kary Antholis, American executive at the television network HBO
Kary Arora (born 1977), the first female professional DJ in Delhi, India
Kary H Lasch (1914–1993), Swedish photographer
Kary Mullis (born 1944), a Nobel Prize–winning American biochemist, author, and lecturer
Kary Ng (born 1986), a pop rock singer in Hong Kong
Kary Osmond, Canadian television chef
Kary Vincent (born 1969), American football player
Kary Vincent Jr. (born 1999), American football player

See also

Karey (disambiguation)
Karly
Karyl